Severo Aparicio Quispe, O. de M.,  (October 8, 1923 – May 6, 2013) was a Peruvian friar of the Mercedarian Order who was made a bishop of the Catholic Church. He wrote a number of works on the history of the Catholic Church and of his Order in Peru.

Life
Aparicio was born in San Pedro de Lloc, Pacasmayo, and later entered the Mercedarian friars. He was ordained a priest on September 22, 1951.

Aparicio was appointed an auxiliary bishop for the Archdiocese of Cuzco as well as titular bishop of Vegesela in Numidia on December 11, 1978. He was consecrated a bishop on March 4, 1979 by Cardinal Juan Landázuri Ricketts, O.F.M.

Aparicio retired as an auxiliary bishop on April 10, 1999, upon reaching the mandatory retirement age of 75. He then took residence at the Mercedarian monastery in the city. He died on May 6, 2013, and was buried in the crypt of the cathedral.

Publications 
 Los mercedarios en los concilios limenses, 1973
 Valores humanos y religiosos del Inca Garcilaso de la Vega, 1989
 Los Mercedarios en la Universidad de San Marcos de Lima, 1999
 Homenaje al R.P. doctor Antonio San Cristóbal Sebastián, Universidad Nacional de San Agustín 2000
 El clero y la rebelión de Túpac Amaru, Band 1 von Colección Pachatusan 2000
 La orden de la Merced en el Perú: estudos históricos, Band 2, Provincia Mercedaria del Perú 2001
 José Pérez Armendáriz: obispo del Cuzco y precursor de la independencia del Peru, Band 3 von Colección Pachatusan 2002
 Siete obispos cuzqueños de la colonia, Band 2 von Colección Pachatusan 2002
 Siervo de Dios P. Francisco Salamanca, Band 4 von Colección Pachatusan 2006
 El arzobispo Goyoneche ante las dificultades de la iglesia del Perú antes las dificultades de la Iglesia del Perú, 1816-1872, 2006

See also
Roman Catholic Archdiocese of Cuzco
Order of the Blessed Virgin Mary of Mercy

References

External links
Cuzco Archdiocese 

1923 births
2013 deaths
People from Pacasmayo Province
Order of the Blessed Virgin Mary of Mercy
20th-century Roman Catholic bishops in Peru
21st-century Roman Catholic bishops in Peru
20th-century Roman Catholic titular bishops
Peruvian non-fiction writers
Historians of the Catholic Church
Historians of monasticism
Historians of Peru
Burials in Peru
Mercedarian bishops
Roman Catholic bishops of Cusco